Nanna Heitmann (born 1994) is a German-Russian documentary photographer, currently living in Moscow. She joined Magnum Photos as a nominee in 2019.

Life and work
Heitmann was born in Ulm, Germany and grew up in Germany. Her mother is from Moscow, and always spoke Russian to her. Heitmann studied photojournalism and documentary photography at the University of Hanover in Germany. She joined Magnum Photos as a nominee in 2019.

For the series Hiding from Baba Yaga, Heitmann traced the southern regions of the Yenisey river, which runs from Mongolia,  through all of Siberia, and into the Arctic Ocean. Along its route she photographed individuals and communities living in some of the coldest territories in Russia. The series Weg vom Fenster (Gone From the Window) is about the workers at Germany's last operating coal mine, .

Heitmann's personal work has been published by National Geographic, Time, Le Monde, de Volkskrant, and Stern magazine. She has worked on assignments for The New York Times, Time, The Washington Post, Stern magazine, and The Seattle Times.

Publications
Foto Kunst Malerei: Fotografien von Heinrich Strieffler und Nanna Heitmann. Landau, Germany: Knecht, 2019. .

Awards
2019: Winner, Newcomer Award, Leica Oskar Barnack Award, for her series Hiding From Baba Yaga
2019: Sunday Times Award for Achievement, the Ian Parry Scholarship, for her series Hiding From Baba Yaga
2020: Finalist (1 of 9), W. Eugene Smith Memorial Fund, for "Russia's Pandemic of Inequality"
2022: World Press Photo, Europe, Stories for "As Frozen Lands Burn"

Exhibitions

Solo exhibitions 
Nanna Heitman, 2020, Leica Gallery, Zingst.

Group exhibitions 
Essere Umane – Le grandi fotografe raccontano il mondo, Museo San Domenico di Forlì, Italy, 2021/22
Close Enough: New Perspectives from 12 Women Photographers of Magnum, International Center of Photography, New York, 29 September 2022 – 9 January 2023

References

External links

Magnum photographers
Russian photojournalists
German photojournalists
21st-century Russian photographers
21st-century German photographers
Russian women photographers
German women photographers
University of Hanover alumni
People from Ulm
Living people
1994 births
21st-century German women
Women photojournalists